"Honey" is a song by Erykah Badu, released on December 11, 2007, as the lead single from her 2008 album New Amerykah Part One (4th World War). The song was produced by 9th Wonder and samples singer Nancy Wilson's 1978 song "I'm in Love".

Music video
Directed by Badu and Chris Robinson, the song's music video was released on January 28, 2008, and was conceived by Badu as an homage to classic records. Set in a small business record store, it follows a customer looking through vintage R&B, hip hop, and rock LP albums, with the albums' cover artwork depicted as moving images with Badu cast in them. According to Robinson, "We wanted a video that spoke to Badu's eclecticism. Those album covers represent all the influences that she embodies." Albums covers that were recreated in the video are those of:

 Rufus featuring Chaka Khan (1975) by Rufus
 Blue (2006) by Diana Ross
 Maggot Brain (1971) by Funkadelic
 Paid in Full (1987) by Eric B. & Rakim
 Honey (1975) by Ohio Players
 Perfect Angel (1975) by Minnie Riperton
 Chameleon (1976) by Labelle
 3 Feet High and Rising (1989) by De La Soul
 Let It Be (1970) by The Beatles
 Illmatic (1994) by Nas
 Physical (1981) by Olivia Newton-John
 Nightclubbing (1981) by Grace Jones
 Head to the Sky (1973) by Earth, Wind & Fire

As a video within a video, the record store's video screen plays an excerpt of the song "Annie" performed by Badu's side project Edith Funker, which features Questlove, James Poyser, Nikka Costa, Mike Elizondo, and Wendy Melvoin. The video also features a cameo appearance by Sa-Ra member Shafiq Husayn. The video also features a recreated version of Rolling Stone magazine's front cover for its January 1981 issue, which originally featured John Lennon and Yoko Ono.

Accolades 
The video for "Honey" won Best Direction at the 2008 MTV Video Music Awards, and was nominated for Best Special Effects, Best Editing, and Best Cinematography.

The video was also nominated for Best Short Form Music Video at the 51st Grammy Awards.

It appeared at number seventy-nine on BET's Notarized: Top 100 Videos of 2008.

In 2011, Complex magazine named it the 29th best music video of the 2000s.

Charts

Weekly charts

Year-end charts

References

External links
 "Honey" music video at YouTube

2007 singles
Erykah Badu songs
Songs written by 9th Wonder
Music videos directed by Chris Robinson (director)
Songs written by Erykah Badu
2007 songs
Universal Motown Records singles
MTV Video Music Award for Best Direction
Songs written by Clarence Carter